Igualapa  is a city and the seat of the municipality of Igualapa, in the state of Guerrero, in southwestern Mexico.

Geography
Igualapa is one of the 81 municipalities in the state of Guerrero. The city is located in the Pacific coastal region southeast of Chilpancingo. 

The city is known for its historic churches and shrines. They are visited by pilgrims from different parts of Mexico.

References

Populated places in Guerrero